Duncan Chessell (born 1970 in Adelaide) is an Australian explorer, mountain guide,  geologist and photographer who has reached the seven highest summits in each of the world's seven continents.

Chessell has been climbing since 1988, guiding since 1994, and has climbed and guided on all seven continents. He started out on the crags and in the gorges of National Parks of Australia, then moved on to larger mountains around the world. He is one of few Australian mountaineers to have climbed and guided Mount Everest and the first South Australian to summit. He has summited Mt Everest three times, in 2001, 2007 and 2010. His ascent in 2010 was from sea level, riding 1600km from the ocean in India. 

He has also guided Cho Oyu the world's 6th highest peak successfully twice and led over 60 expeditions world wide. He was also a member of the first Australian ascent of Makalu, the 5th highest peak in the world. In New Zealand, he has climbed technically hard (grade six) routes and is two summits away from completing all the 3000m peaks in New Zealand. He has also climbed the Seven Summits and is one of only about a dozen guides to have led expeditions to all of them.

In 2006, Chessell worked with a group of young people with cancer, known as CanTeen, guiding them to climb Mt Kilimanjaro.
His favourite expedition was a sea-to-summit ascent of the highest peak in Antarctica, Mt Vinson in 2007, with fellow Australian's Rob North, Peter Weeks and Rob Jackson. 

He founded DCXP Mountain Journeys Pty Ltd in late 2000, which he ran for a decade guiding the seven summits including guiding Mt Everest commercially and summiting Mt Everest three times. Other destinations included the Kokoda Track in Papua New Guinea, which his company DCXP guided thousands of Australian trekkers over between 2003 and 2010. He was a member of the New Zealand Mountain Guides Association. 

In 2010, Chessell sold DCXP, and shifted back into the field of geology and became the managing director of the public mineral exploration company Endeavour Discoveries Ltd (2010-2016). Endeavour was based in South Australia exploring for base and precious metals such as nickel and gold in Papua New Guinea, South Australia and the Northern Territory. In 2011 he became the chairman of Endeavour Discoveries Ltd.

In 2014, Chessell was founding chairman of the Himalayan Development Foundation Australia Inc (HDFA) an organisation dedicated to the helping children in a Nepal get a start in life via education. The HDFA has raised over 100,000 in its first year and built a boarding school in Nepal with some of the proceeds in the remote Kanchenjunga region of East Nepal. Over its first five years of operation HDFA has delivered school rebuilds, built health posts, micro hydro electric schemes, upgraded education and livelihood programs to over 10,000 people in Nepal in three regions: Kanchenjunga, Indrawati and Sindhupalchowk delivering over A$1,000,000 in projects.

In 2017, Chessell was founding director of Northern Cobalt Ltd, which is currently conducting mineral exploration for battery metals (cobalt, lithium, vanadium, copper and nickel) in Australia and North America. 

He currently works between the mineral exploration industry for Coolabah Group (private exploration, project generation and consulting services), Northern Cobalt Ltd(now called resolution Minerals, ASX listed), HDFA and public speaking engagements to corporates and schools.

Chessell lives in Adelaide, South Australia.

See also
 Mountaineering
 List of Mount Everest summiters by number of times to the summit

Notes

External links
 AdelaideNow: Duncan Chessell Feature
 ExposeSA Rising Stars Success Story: Duncan Chessell
 ABC Australian Story Transcript: CanTeen (Featuring Duncan Chessell)
 Mining News - Northern Cobalts lists on ASX and commences drilling
 : Northern Cobalt Ltd ASX- N27 listed mineral explorer
 Duncan Chessell board member HDFA - Himalayan Development Foundation Australia
 Duncan Chessell - Gold exploration in South Australia

Australian explorers
Australian geologists
People educated at Prince Alfred College
1970 births
Living people
Australian summiters of Mount Everest